Bhardwaj is a surname used by Brahmins and rajputs relating to sage Bharadwaja gotra in India.

Notable people
Notable people with the surname include

Sports
Anil Bhardwaj (cricketer) (born 1954), Indian cricketer
B. M. Rahul Bharadwaj (born 2000) Indian badminton player
Manu Bhardwaj, Indian cricketer
 Mohini Bhardwaj (born 1978), American gymnast
Om Prakash Bhardwaj, Indian boxing coach
Vijay Bharadwaj (born 1975), Indian cricketer

Entertainers
Ankit Bhardwaj, Indian film and television actor
Hetu Bhardwaj, Indian writer
Lavanya Bhardwaj, Indian actor and model
Musafir Ram Bhardwaj, Indian musician
Nitish Bharadwaj (born 1963), Indian film actor and politician
Bharadwaj (composer) (born 1960), Indian music director, composer, singer-songwriter, and music producer, born Ramani Bharadwaj
Reena Bhardwaj, British singer
Rekha Bhardwaj, Indian singer
Rohit Bhardwaj, Indian actor
Shweta Bhardwaj, Indian actress
Siddharth Bhardwaj, Indian television personality
Sumit Bhardwaj (born 1992), Indian actor
Vishal Bhardwaj (born 1965), Indian film director and musician

Politicians
Deepak Bharadwaj (1950–2013), an Indian politician
H. R. Bhardwaj (1937–2020)  Indian politician
Naresh Bhardwaj (born 1959) is a Canadian politician
Ram Chandra Bharadwaj (died 1918), Indian politician
Saurabh Bhardwaj (born 1979), Indian politician

Others
Babu Bharadwaj (1948–2016), Indian writer in Malayalam-language
Raman Bhardwaj, Scottish broadcast journalist
Somnath Bharadwaj (born 1964), Indian theoretical physicist

Hindu surnames